The OM613 is a turbocharged straight 6 diesel engine produced by Mercedes-Benz. It is the successor to the OM606 and was replaced by the OM648 engine in 2003.

Design 
The OM613 was developed alongside the four-cylinder OM611 and five-cylinder OM612 engines. The three engines have the same basic design and share components such as the pistons, fuel injectors, and glow plugs. The OM613 engine features 4 valves per cylinder, dual overhead camshafts, oxidation catalytic converter, and exhaust gas recirculation. Models with the engine are branded as '320 CDI'.

Models

OM613 DE32 LA 
 1999–2003 W210 E320 CDI
 1999–2003 W220 S320 CDI

References 

OM613
Diesel engines by model
Straight-six engines